Congregation is the third full length, and first live, album by Irish alternative rock band Kerbdog. The bulk of the album was recorded in 2012 at three different gigs in England and Ireland. A studio track entitled "Electricity" (a re-working of an old 1997 demo called "Soaking Wet") was recorded at Tower Studios in Evesham in July 2014. A Pledge campaign was unveiled on 23 June 2014 to help fund and promote the new release. The campaign had reached 100% of its goal on 6 October 2014. The album was released on 10 October 2014 through Pledge Music and Graphite Records.

"Congregation" was released as a CD/DVD package and also as a Download. The DVD includes videos for "Electricity", "Severed", and "Pointless". There is also a live video of "On the Turn" from Sonisphere recorded on 6 July 2014, featuring Dave Draper on bass as a last minute replacement for Colin Fennelly, although the audio itself is the live album version from 2012.

Track listing
All songs written by Kerbdog.
"On the Turn"
"Pledge"
"Mexican Wave"
"Secure"
"Lesser Shelf"
"Rewind"
"Severed"
"Didn't Even Try"
"Earthworks"
"Scram"
"Dry Riser"
"Sally"
"Sorry for the Record"
"End of Green"
"Pointless"
"JJ's Song"
"Electricity"

New studio track

Personnel
Cormac Battle - Guitar, Vocals
Darragh Butler - Drums
Billy Dalton - Guitar on track 17
Colin Fennelly - Bass
Dave Draper - Producer, Engineer, Mixing
Canice Mills - Assistant live engineer
Elliot Vaughan - Assistant live engineer
Gareth Strange - Assistant live engineer

UK Singles
"Electricity" b/w "Pointless" (live) (7" vinyl)

References

Kerbdog albums
2014 albums